Maurertown is a census-designated place (CDP) in Shenandoah County, Virginia, United States. The population as of the 2010 Census was 770.

The Abraham Beydler House and Shenandoah County Farm are listed on the National Register of Historic Places.

References

Virginia Trend Report 2: State and Complete Places (Sub-state 2010 Census Data)

Unincorporated communities in Virginia
Census-designated places in Shenandoah County, Virginia
Census-designated places in Virginia